The 1981 Cincinnati Reds season consisted of the Reds finishing with an overall record of 66–42, giving them the best win–loss record in all of Major League Baseball.  However, due to a split-season format, caused by a mid-season players' strike, they failed to make the MLB playoffs this year because they did not finish first in either half of the season; they finished in second place in both halves by scant margins. The Reds finished the first half of the season in second place with a record of 35–21, just one-half game behind the eventual World Champion Los Angeles Dodgers, and one-and-a-half games behind the Houston Astros in the second half, in which the Reds were 31–21, good for second place, again.  The Reds were managed by John McNamara and played their home games at Riverfront Stadium.

Offseason 
 January 22, 1981: Mike Grace and John Hale were traded by the Reds to the Baltimore Orioles for Joe Kerrigan and John Buffamoyer (minors).

Regular season

Season standings

Record vs. opponents

Notable transactions 
 June 8, 1981: Terry McGriff was drafted by the Cincinnati Reds in the 8th round of the 1981 amateur draft. Player signed June 12, 1981.
 June 8, 1981: Paul O'Neill was drafted by the Cincinnati Reds in the 4th round of the 1981 amateur draft. Player signed June 11, 1981.
 September 10, 1981: Doug Bair was traded by the Reds to the St. Louis Cardinals for Joe Edelen and Neil Fiala.

Roster

Player stats

Batting

Starters by position 
Note: Pos = Position; G = Games played; AB = At bats; H = Hits; Avg. = Batting average; HR = Home runs; RBI = Runs batted in

Other batters 
Note: G = Games played; AB = At bats; H = Hits; Avg. = Batting average; HR = Home runs; RBI = Runs batted in

Pitching

Starting pitchers 
Note: G = Games pitched; IP = Innings pitched; W = Wins; L = Losses; ERA = Earned run average; SO = Strikeouts

Other pitchers 
Note: G = Games pitched; IP = Innings pitched; W = Wins; L = Losses; ERA = Earned run average; SO = Strikeouts

Relief pitchers 
Note: G = Games pitched; W = Wins; L = Losses; SV = Saves; ERA = Earned run average; SO = Strikeouts

Awards and honors 
Johnny Bench, Hutch Award

Farm system

Notes

References 
1981 Cincinnati Reds season at Baseball Reference

Cincinnati Reds seasons
Cincinnati Reds season
Cinc